Printzia is a genus of South African plants in the tribe Astereae within the family Asteraceae.

 Species

 formerly included
see Lepidostephium 
 Printzia asteroides Schltr. ex Bews - Lepidostephium asteroides (Bolus & Schltr.) Kroner

References

Astereae
Asteraceae genera
Endemic flora of South Africa